Neolissochilus vittatus is a species of cyprinid in the genus Neolissochilus. It inhabits the Salween basin.

References

Cyprinidae
Cyprinid fish of Asia
Fish described in 1945